The 1977 Milwaukee Brewers season involved the Brewers' finishing sixth in the American League East with a record of 67 wins and 95 losses.

Offseason 
 November 19, 1976: Sal Bando was signed as a free agent by the Brewers.
 December 6, 1976: Jim Colborn and Darrell Porter were traded by the Brewers to the Kansas City Royals for Jamie Quirk, Jim Wohlford and a player to be named later. The Royals completed the deal by sending Bob McClure to the Brewers on March 15, 1977.
 December 7, 1976: Jeff Yurak was drafted by the Brewers from the San Francisco Giants in the 1976 minor league draft.
 February 25, 1977: Ken McMullen was purchased by the Brewers from the Oakland Athletics.

Regular season 
 July 1, 1977: The Brewers played their first game in Seattle in 8 years, when they were the failed Seattle Pilots. The Brewers beat the hometown expansion Mariners 2–1.
 September 14, 1977: Ken McMullen hit a home run in the last at bat of his career.

Season standings

Record vs. opponents

Notable transactions 
 June 7, 1977: Paul Molitor was drafted by the Brewers in the 1st round (3rd pick) of the 1977 Major League Baseball draft. Player signed June 24, 1977.

Roster

Player stats

Batting

Starters by position 
Note: Pos = Position; G = Games played; AB = At bats; H = Hits; Avg. = Batting average; HR = Home runs; RBI = Runs batted in

Other batters 
Note: G = Games played; AB = At bats; H = Hits; Avg. = Batting average; HR = Home runs; RBI = Runs batted in

Pitching

Starting pitchers 
Note: G = Games pitched; IP = Innings pitched; W = Wins; L = Losses; ERA = Earned run average; SO = Strikeouts

Other pitchers 
Note: G = Games pitched; IP = Innings pitched; W = Wins; L = Losses; ERA = Earned run average; SO = Strikeouts

Relief pitchers 
Note: G = Games pitched; W = Wins; L = Losses; SV = Saves; ERA = Earned run average; SO = Strikeouts

Farm system

The Brewers' farm system consisted of four minor league affiliates in 1977. The Burlington Bees won the Midwest League championship.

Notes

References 
1977 Milwaukee Brewers at Baseball Reference
1977 Milwaukee Brewers at Baseball Almanac

Milwaukee Brewers seasons
Milwaukee Brewers season
Mil